The 2021–22 season was the 97th season in the existence of AS Monaco FC and the club's ninth consecutive season in the top flight of French football. In addition to the domestic league, Monaco participated in this season's editions of the Coupe de France, the UEFA Champions League and the UEFA Europa League.

Season events

On 18 August, Sofiane Diop extended his contract with Monaco, keeping him at the club until the summer of 2026.

On 1 January, Monaco announced that head coach Niko Kovač had left his role on 30 December 2021.

On 3 January, Monaco announced the signing of Philippe Clement as the head coach with a three-season contract.

On 13 January, Eliot Matazo extended his contract with Monaco until the summer of 2026.

Transfers

Summer
On 25 June, Gil Dias left Monaco to sign for Benfica, and Arthur Zagré joined Utrecht on loan for the next two seasons, with Utrecht having the option to make the move permanent.

On 27 June, Monaco announced the loan signing of Alexander Nübel from Bayern Munich, until the end of the 2022–23 season.

On 12 July, Monaco announced the signing of Ismail Jakobs from 1. FC Köln on a contract until June 2026.

On 16 July, Jean-Eudes Aholou joined Strasbourg on a season-long loan deal.

On 18 July, Fodé Ballo-Touré left Monaco to join Milan.

On 20 July, youngsters Boris Popovic and Edgaras Utkus joined Cercle Brugge on loan for the season.

On 24 July, Monaco announced that Jorge had left the club to return to Brazil and sign for Palmeiras.

On 2 August, Henry Onyekuru left Monaco to sign permanently for Olympiacos for an undisclosed fee, and Monaco announced the signing of Jean Lucas to a five-year contract from Olympique Lyonnais.

On 4 August, Monaco announced the signing of Myron Boadu from AZ Alkmaar.

On 11 August, Monaco announced that Gabriel Pereira had left the club to return to Brazil and sign with Athletico Paranaense.

On 12 August, Giulian Biancone left Monaco to sign for Troyes. Two days later, 14 August, Enzo Millot left Monaco to sign for VfB Stuttgart.

On 19 August, Benjamin Lecomte joined Atlético Madrid on loan for the season.

On 25 August, Pietro Pellegri joined A.C. Milan on loan for the season, with the option to make the move permanent.

On 28 August, Antonio Barreca left Monaco to join Lecce on a season-long loan deal.

On 31 August, Anthony Musaba left Monaco to sign for SC Heerenveen on a season-long loan deal, whilst Willem Geubbels joined Nantes on a similar deal. Also on 31 August, Keita Baldé left Monaco to sign permanently for Cagliari, whilst Julien Serrano was also released by the club.

Winter
On 1 January, Monaco announced the signing of Vanderson from Grêmio, on a five-year contract.

On 22 January, Monaco announced that Wilson Isidor had been sold to Lokomotiv Moscow.

On 16 February, Strahinja Pavlović joined Basel on loan for the remainder of the season.

Squad

Transfers

In

Loans in

 Transfers announced on the above date, became official when the transfer window opened on 1 July.

Out

 Transfers announced on the above date, became official when the transfer window opened on 1 July.

Loans out

 Transfers announced on the above date, became official when the transfer window opened on 1 July.

Released

Friendlies

Competitions

Overall record

Ligue 1

League table

Results summary

Results by round

Matches
The league fixtures were announced on 25 June 2021.

Coupe de France

UEFA Champions League

Third qualifying round
The draw for the third qualifying round was held on 19 July 2021.

Play-off round
The draw for the play-off round was held on 2 August 2021.

UEFA Europa League

The draw for the UEFA Europa League group stage was held on 27 August, drawing Monaco with PSV Eindhoven, Real Sociedad and Sturm Graz.

Group stage

Knockout phase

Round of 16
The draw for the round of 16 was held on 25 February 2022.

Statistics

Appearances and goals

|-
!colspan="14"|Players away from the club on loan:

|-
!colspan="14"|Players who left Monaco during the season:

|}

Goalscorers

Clean sheets

Disciplinary record

|-
|colspan="20"|Players away on loan:
|-
|colspan="20"|Players who left Monaco during the season:

References

AS Monaco FC seasons
Monaco
Monaco